Edithia Lois Wilde (August 14, 1907 – February 16, 1995) was an American actress, model, dancer, and beauty contest winner. She was most famous for appearing in B-Western and Action movies, and also known for her appearance in  Undersea Kingdom (1936).

Career
By the time she was 15 years old, Wilde was working as a model and was a ballet dancer at the Metropolitan Opera House. Artists for whom she posed included Howard Chandler Christy, Arnold Genthe, and Renee Prahar.

While dancing at the Metropolitan Opera, she was discovered by Florenz Ziegfeld, Jr., who hired her to perform in the 1923 Ziegfeld Follies. During this period, she "was once voted the most beautiful girl in the Follies organization."

Wilde co-starred with Ray Corrigan in Undersea Kingdom (1936) a serial from Republic Pictures. She also co-starred with Gene Autry in 1936's The Singing Cowboy.

Personal life
On March 8, 1925, at eighteen years of age, Wilde married Leslie Major Sherriff, a banjo-player for the Paul Whiteman Band, in Brooklyn, New York. When she became pregnant with her first child, Marjorie, she left the Follies.

After moving from Atlantic City to Beverly Hills, she had a hysterectomy. While recovering in a wheelchair at a hair salon, a man approached her and asked if she had ever been in theater. This inspired her to pursue film roles.

Wilde and Sherriff divorced in 1937. In 1938, she married William Henry Snow, who was the president of a radio recording company.

Death 
Wilde died on February 16, 1995, in Attleboro, Massachusetts at the age of 87.

Partial filmography 
 Step on It (1936) as Connie Banning
 The Millionaire Kid (1936) as Kitty Malone
 Caryl of the Mountains (1936) as Caryl Foray
 The Singing Cowboy (1936) as Helen Blake
 Undersea Kingdom (1936) as Diana Compton
 Palm Springs (1936) as Undetermined Secondary Role (uncredited)
 Wildcat Trooper (1936) as Ruth Reynolds
 Stormy Trails (1936) as Connie Curlew
 Outcast (1937) as Mary Hallifax (uncredited)
 Nobody's Baby (1937) as  Radio Station Receptionist (uncredited)
 Pick a Star (1937) as Minor Role (uncredited)
 Brothers of the West (1937) as Celia Chandler
 Hopalong Rides Again (1937) as Laura Peters
 Sky Racket (1937) as Sugar (uncredited)
 Danger Valley (1937) as Mickey Temple
 Love Nest (1951) as Landlady (uncredited)
 Steel Town (1952) as Nurse (uncredited)
 Ma and Pa Kettle at Waikiki (1955) as Boat Passenger (uncredited)
 Oh, God! You Devil (1984) as Casino Patron (uncredited)

References

External links
 

1907 births
1995 deaths
American film actresses
20th-century American actresses
Ziegfeld girls